P. France & Co. was a nineteenth-century publishing company based in the early years at 8 The Side, Newcastle: They were responsible for the editing, publishing, printing (and partially for the) selling of the chapbook "Songs of the Bards of the Tyne; A choice selection of original songs, chiefly in the Newcastle Dialect".

See also
Geordie dialect words
France's Songs of the Bards of the Tyne - 1850

References

External links
 Songs of the Bards of the Tyne
 Farne archives

Music publishing companies of the United Kingdom